Podrusów  is a settlement in the administrative district of Gmina Susiec, within Tomaszów Lubelski County, Lublin Voivodeship, in eastern Poland. It is around 30 km south of Zamość.

References

Villages in Tomaszów Lubelski County